Paul Kriwaczek (30 November 1937 - 2 March 2011) was a British historian and television producer.

Life 

He was born in Vienna on 30 November 1937. He escaped from Nazi Austria to England in 1939. He attended Kilburn Grammar School in London and studied at the London Hospital Medical School.

Career 

In 1970, he joined the BBC where he remained for twenty-five years. He also served as head of Central Asian Affairs at the BBC World Service.

Books 
 In Search of Zarathustra: Across Iran and Central Asia to Find the World's First Prophet (2002)
 Babylon: Mesopotamia And The Birth Of Civilization (2010)
 Yiddish Civilisation: The Rise and Fall of a Forgotten Nation (2005), Random House, 
 E=mc²: The Great Ideas that Shaped Our World
 Documentary for the Small Screen (1997)

References

External links
 Publisher's biography on Macmillan.com

British historians
British television producers
Austrian emigrants to the United Kingdom
Emigrants from Austria after the Anschluss
1937 births
2011 deaths